Derek Francis Digby (14 March 1931 – 27 September 2005) was an English retired footballer who played as an outside-forward in the 1950s for Exeter City and Southampton.

Football career
Digby was born in Teignmouth in Devon and started his football career at nearby Dawlish Town before joining Exeter City in August 1949. He made his first-team debut during the 1951–52 season, going on to make 31 appearances in the Football League Third Division South.

In September 1953, he refused to accept the new contract offered by Exeter, and was signed by George Roughton who had managed Exeter until March 1952, and was now in charge at fellow Third Division side, Southampton. He was immediately drafted into the first team, replacing John Hoskins at outside-left. Described as "quick on his toes", he made an encouraging debut against Colchester United on 23 September, setting up the winning goal for Henry Horton. Despite this promise, he was unable to secure a regular place in the side, with Hoskins returning after six matches. From mid-November onwards, Digby made five further appearances, including three at outside-right in place of John Flood.

In the 1954–55 season, Digby was unable to dislodge Hoskins and Flood from their places on the wing, making only four appearances, two on the left in September and two on the right in December, and was released in the summer of 1955.

He then dropped into non-league football, first with Ledbury Town and later at Welwyn Garden City.

References

Bibliography

External links
Career details on www.11v11.com

Photograph of Digby
Photograph of Digby with Bobby McLaughlin and Bryn Elliott

1931 births
2005 deaths
People from Teignmouth
English footballers
Association football outside forwards
Dawlish United F.C. players
Exeter City F.C. players
Southampton F.C. players
Ledbury Town F.C. players
Welwyn Garden City F.C. players